A Farmyard Drama (French:Un drame à la ferme) is a 1921 Belgian silent drama film directed by Théo Bergerat.

Cast
 Léopold 
 Plangère 
 Aimé Maider 
 Jimmy O'Kelly

References

Bibliography
 Philippe Rège. Encyclopedia of French Film Directors, Volume 1. Scarecrow Press, 2009.

External links 
 

1921 films
1920s French-language films
1920s Dutch-language films
Films directed by Théo Bergerat
Films set in Belgium
Belgian black-and-white films
Belgian drama films
1921 drama films
1920s multilingual films
Belgian multilingual films